Piotr Sztompka (born 2 March 1944, in Warsaw, Poland) is a Polish sociologist known for his work on the theory of social trust. He is professor of sociology at the Jagiellonian University in Kraków, Poland, and has also frequently served as visiting professor at the University of California, Los Angeles, and at Columbia University in New York City.

From 2002 to 2006 he was the 15th president of the International Sociological Association.

Life
Sztompka studied law and sociology at the Jagiellonian University in Kraków, Poland, obtaining a Ph.D. degree there in 1970. 

Two years later, he was awarded a Fulbright scholarship to the University of California, Berkeley. Since 1974 he has been on the faculty of its Sociology Department, as a teaching assistant and subsequently as a professor. 

In the 1970s, Sztompka established a close collaboration with Robert K. Merton, which greatly influenced Sztompka's view of the discipline.

Sztompka has also taught as visiting professor at Columbia University, the University of Michigan, Johns Hopkins University, the University of Rome, and Tischner European University. He is a fellow of the Collegium Invisibile.

Contributions
Sztompka's principal sociological interests include the social phenomenon of trust, social change, and, recently, visual sociology.

Works
 System and Function (Studies in Anthropology, 1974).
 Sociological Dilemmas (1979).
 Robert K. Merton:  an Intellectual Profile (1986)
 The New Technological Challenge and Socialist Societies (editor, 1987).
 Rethinking Progress (with Jeffrey C. Alexander, 1990).
 Society in Action:  the Theory of Social Becoming (1991).
 Sociology in Europe:  in Search of Identity (with Birgitta Nedelmann, 1993). 
 The Sociology of Social Change (1993).
 Agency and Structure:  Reorienting Social Theory (International Studies in Global Change, vol. 4; editor, 1994).
 Robert K. Merton, On Social Structure and Science (editor), Chicago, University of Chicago Press, 1996, .
 Trust:  a Sociological Theory (1999).

See also
Polish sociology

References

External links
Short biography
Interview with Sztompka
Sztompka's CV
Interview with Sztompka as a President of ISA

1944 births
Living people
Polish sociologists
Columbia University staff
University of Michigan faculty
Johns Hopkins University faculty
Academic staff of Jagiellonian University
University of California, Los Angeles faculty
Fellows of Collegium Invisibile
Presidents of the International Sociological Association